William Jenner may refer to:
Caitlyn Jenner (born 1949; birth name William Bruce Jenner), American television personality, athlete, and LGBT rights activist

Sir William Jenner, 1st Baronet (1815–1898), English physician who discovered the distinction between typhus and typhoid
William E. Jenner (1908–1985), U.S. Senator from Indiana
William John Francis Jenner (born 1940), British sinologist